The 1875 Connecticut gubernatorial election was held on April 5, 1875. Incumbent governor and Democratic nominee Charles R. Ingersoll defeated Republican nominee J. Greene with 53.23% of the vote.

This was the last gubernatorial election to elect the governor of Connecticut to a term of one year, from May 7, 1875, to May 7, 1876.

General election

Candidates
Major party candidates
Charles R. Ingersoll, Democratic
J. Greene, Republican

Other candidates
Henry D. Smith, Temperance

Results

References

1875
Connecticut
Gubernatorial